Super Crooks is a Japanese-American superhero anime streaming television series based on the comic book series of the same name by writer Mark Millar and artist Leinil Francis Yu. The series was written by Dai Satō from Millar's story, and it was directed by Motonobu Hori in his solo directorial debut.  The 13-episode series premiered on Netflix worldwide on November 25, 2021. It serves as a spin-off to Jupiter's Legacy. In June 2021, a live-action Super Crooks series and second spin-off from the simultaneously-cancelled Jupiter's Legacy was announced to be in active development.

Premise 
Small-time crook Johnny Bolt recruits a team of eight super-villains to perform a super-powered heist.

Characters 

Johnny Bolt is the main protagonist and a two-bit crook looking to pull off the ultimate heist. He originally wanted to be a hero, but after accidentally causing a chain reaction of deaths after scaring patrons at a pool when he fell in and electrocuted those in it, he switched to petty larceny to get by.

Johnny's girlfriend. She has power to implant illusions in people's minds; akin to the power of suggestion. Despite Johnny's bad habit of never listening to her, they have a strong and genuine romance.
 / 

A famous criminal from the 1970s during his youth. Unlike the rest of the crooks, he has no powers; instead using flamethrower gear like Heat Wave. He taught Kasey that pulling off one great heist instead making a living from them was the better move; Heat only ever showed up once a decade to refresh the terror of villainy when things got too dull.

 / 

A sophisticated criminal with the power to phase through solid objects.

A small time thief with the power of telekinesis.

The younger of the Diesel brothers. He has the power of regeneration, allowing him to instantly heal from any injury, regrow lost body parts, and even survive being dismembered.

The elder of the Diesel brothers. He shares his younger brother's power of regeneration.

A small time crook with the power to manipulate the weather.

A brutal anti-hero and the secondary antagonist. He randomly gets powers every day which lasts for only 24 hours.

Matts' right-hand man and successor as head of The Network.

A longtime crime boss in charge of The Network, akin to the Kingpin and the main antagonist. His name comes from his style of revenge; exploding the heads of loved ones of whoever crosses him, no matter how small the offenses.

Episodes

Production 
Netflix first announced that the series was in production with Studio Bones in March 2019, and the series was ready for its world premiere at the Annecy International Animation Film Festival in June 2021. At its premiere, director Motonobu Hori explained that because the series takes place, in part, before the comic book series, Mark Millar provided additional back story for Dai Satō to adapt, and Leinil Francis Yu provided younger character designs for Takashi Mitani to translate into animation.  Towa Tei composed the music for the series.

The first nine episodes of the series serve as a prequel to the comics and then overlap with the comic storyline for the last four episodes, which serves as a straightforward adaptation, with the series also set in the same fictional universe as the live-action series Jupiter's Legacy. In June 2021, a live-action Supercrooks series and direct spin-off continuation of the simultaneously-cancelled Jupiter's Legacy was announced to be in active development.

Release 
At Netflix's Tudum event in September 2021, the primary voices from Kenjiro Tsuda and Maaya Sakamoto were revealed along with the release date of November 25, 2021.

Reception

References

External links 
 
 
 

2021 anime ONAs
Animated television series based on Marvel Comics
Anime based on comics
Bones (studio)
Heist fiction
Japanese-language Netflix original programming
Netflix original anime
Superhero television shows
Superheroes in anime and manga
Supervillain television shows
Japan in fiction